Partial general elections were held in Luxembourg on 26 May and 2 June 1908, electing 29 out of 50 members of the Chamber of Deputies.

Results

References 

Luxembourg
1908 in Luxembourg
1908
May 1908 events
June 1908 events